Nestingum is the name said to have been given by King Alfred the Great of England to a legendary foundling who was identified as an ancestor of Saint Wulfhilde of Barking ( 980), as set out in her genealogy in Goscelin's life of the saint.

Biography
Goscelin's account, written  1060 about purported events dating to the late 9th century, may have its source in a lost tradition of Wilton nunnery, with the aim of providing Wulfhilde with a royal lineage; the name is said to be early Old English, but appears in no other contemporary text. Translated from Latin:

In Tennyson's poem "The Last Tournament", part of his Arthurian cycle, Idylls of the King, the story of the nestling nursed by Guinevere was inspired by the legend of Nestingum as recounted in Sharon Turner's History of the Anglo-Saxons, and perhaps in Bishop Stanley's Book of Birds.

References 

9th-century English people
Alfred the Great
English folklore
Legendary English people
People whose existence is disputed